Gollapalle, Gollapalli or Gollapally is name of a place in India:

Places 
 Gollapalli, Eluru district a village in Eluru district, Andhra Pradesh
 Gollapalli, Krishnagiri district is a village in Krishnagiri district, Tamil Nadu
 Gollapally, Ranga Reddy district
 Chinna Gollapally
 Gollapally, Karimnagar, Telangana
 Gollapalle, Duvvur Mandal, Kadapa District

Other uses 
 Samuel Gollapalle

See also 
 Palli (disambiguation)